Rex Henry Morgan , was the founder of The Pittwater House School, located on the northern beaches of Sydney, New South Wales, Australia. For his services to education Morgan was appointed a Member of the Order of the British Empire (MBE) in 1969 and was appointed as a Member of the Order of Australia (AM) in 2002.

Morgan was appointed (1978 - 1983) as NSW Committee Member of the Duke of Edinburgh's International Award - Australia; and from 2001 - 2009 served as Deputy Chair of The Friends of The Duke of Edinburgh Award in Australia and during 2010 - 2011 as its Chair/President.

Honours
Silver Distinguished Service Medal, The Duke of Edinburgh's International Award - Australia (2017)

References

External links
 Pittwater House Schools website
 Duke of Ed website

Living people
Members of the Order of Australia
Members of the Order of the British Empire
Year of birth missing (living people)
Place of birth missing (living people)
Fellows of the Royal Geographical Society